Hensley may refer to:

People with the surname:
 Hensley (surname)

People with the first name:
Hensley Henson (1863–1947), English bishop
Hensley Koeiman (born 1956), Curaçaoan politician
Hensley Meulens (born 1967), Dutch baseball player
 Hensley Anthony Neville (1957 - 1992), Singaporean convicted murderer
Hensley Paulina (born 1993), Dutch sprinter
Hensley Sapenter (born 1939), American football player

Companies with the name:
 Hensley & Co., a beer distributor in Arizona

In places:
 Hensley, Arkansas

Other:
 Hensley-Gusman House